Northern Tablelands, an electoral district of the Legislative Assembly in the Australian state of New South Wales, has had two incarnations: as a two-member district from 1920 to 1927, and as a single-member district from 1981 until the present.


Members

Election results

Elections in the 2010s

2019

2015

2013 by-election

2011

Elections in the 2000s

2007

2003

Elections in the 1990s

1999

1995

1991

Elections in the 1980s

1988

1987 by-election

1984

1981

1927 - 1981

Elections in the 1920s

1925

1922

1920

References

New South Wales state electoral results by district